School of Death (Spanish: El colegio de la muerte) is a 1975 Spanish horror film directed by Pedro L. Ramírez and starring Dean Selmier and Sandra Mozarowsky. It follows a girls' boarding school in 1899 London where the students are forced to undergo brain surgery to eliminate their memories, before being forced into prostitution for wealthy aristocrats.

Cast

Release

Home media
Mondo Macabro released the film for the first time on Blu-ray in 2021.

References

External links

1975 horror films
Spanish horror films
Films about prostitution
Films set in 1899
Films set in London
Films set in schools
Gothic horror films